Shoreham is an incorporated village in the Town of Brookhaven, Suffolk County, New York, United States. The population was 531 at the 2010 census. It is officially known as the Incorporated Village of Shoreham.

History 
At Shoreham, Nikola Tesla built the Wardenclyffe Tower, which was dismantled in 1917. Nowadays there is the static inverter plant of the HVDC Cross Sound Cable. A non profit organization is in the process of turning Nikola Tesla's laboratory and the property where the Wardenclyffe Tower was once located into a museum honoring the life and work of Nikola Tesla.

The Shoreham Nuclear Power Plant was approved for Shoreham, but it was later disapproved as the result of public protest. The builder, Long Island Lighting Company (LILCO), was partially reimbursed for money spent on construction. The municipal bonds that were floated to reimburse the builder are being paid off by a special levy on the electric bills of residents of Long Island.

Shoreham was served by the Shoreham LIRR station from 1900 to 1910. It was located near the intersection of North Country Road and Randall Road.

Geography
Shoreham is located on the North Shore of Long Island. It is approximately 100 km (70 miles) from New York City. East Shoreham and Shoreham share a post office, which has 11786 as the zip code. Despite the official names, most local people invariably refer to East Shoreham as Shoreham, and to Shoreham as Shoreham Village.

Demographics

As of the census of 2000, there were 417 people, 145 households, and 126 families residing in the village. The population density was 938.3 people per square mile (365.9/km2). There were 163 housing units at an average density of 366.8 per square mile (143.0/km2). In 2010, the racial makeup of the village was 72.4% White, 12.6% Black or African American, 4.8% Asian, 0.9% Native American, and 0.2% Pacific Islander. 6.2% were of some other race, and 2.9% were of two or more races; Hispanics of any race comprised 16.3% of the population.

There were 145 households, out of which 38.6% had children under the age of 18 living with them, 74.5% were married couples living together, 8.3% had a female householder with no husband present, and 13.1% were non-families. 11.0% of all households were made up of individuals, and 6.9% had someone living alone who was 65 years of age or older. The average household size was 2.88 and the average family size was 3.11.

In the village, the population was spread out, with 27.6% under the age of 18, 6.2% from 18 to 24, 17.7% from 25 to 44, 36.0% from 45 to 64, and 12.5% who were 65 years of age or older. The median age was 44 years. For every 100 females, there were 99.5 males. For every 100 females age 18 and over, there were 88.8 males.

The median income for a household in the village was $109,719, and the median income for a family was $116,985. Males had a median income of $81,873 versus $31,250 for females. The per capita income for the village was $37,620. None of the families and 1.4% of the population were living below the poverty threshold, including no under eighteens and none of those over 64.

Notable people
D. B. Sweeney (born 1961), actor
Carter Rubin (born 2005), singer, winner of season 19 of NBC's The Voice

References

External links
 Village of Shoreham official website
 Tesla Science Center at Wardenclyffe official website

Brookhaven, New York
Villages in New York (state)
Long Island Sound
Villages in Suffolk County, New York
Populated coastal places in New York (state)